Bally Nischinda Chittaranjan Vidyalaya is a high school located in Bally, Howrah district in the Indian state of West Bengal. The school was established in 1951. The school belongs to Nischinda Gram Panchayat in Bally area. The school is taught from class five to class twelve. The school is mainly run by day branch.

References 

 https://web.archive.org/web/20190616221202/http://schoolspedia.com/website/bally-nischinda-chittaranjan-vidyalaya-howrah
 https://m.facebook.com/pages/category/High-School/Bally-Nischinda-Chittaranjan-Vidyalaya-152949838092603/
https://www.icbse.com/schools/bally-nischinda-chittaranjan-v-z5wwy4
http://wbchse.nic.in/admin/school_details.php?hp=6024

Schools in Howrah district
High schools and secondary schools in West Bengal
1951 establishments in West Bengal